José María Estudillo (died April 8, 1830) was a Spanish-born Californio military officer and early settler of San Diego. He is the founder of the Estudillo family of California and served as Commandant of the Presidio of San Diego.

Life
Commandant of the Presidio of San Diego from October 23, 1820, to September 1821 and again from 1827 to his death in 1830.

Estudillo married Gertrudis Horcasitas. In 1827 Estudillo's son, José Antonio Estudillo, built a large L-shaped adobe house for his father on land granted by Governor José María de Echeandía. The adobe was later enlarged and became U-shaped. The house is still standing, known as Casa de Estudillo, and is one of the oldest surviving buildings in California. It is located in Old Town San Diego State Historic Park, on the southeast side of the Old Town San Diego plaza, and is designated a National Historic Landmark in its own right.

José Antonio Estudillo was the grantee of Rancho Janal.  Estudillo's other children were José Joaquin Estudillo, grantee of Rancho San Leandro, on the eastern shore of the San Francisco Bay; María Dolores Estudillo, who married Juan Bandini; and Magdalena Estudillo, the grantee who received Rancho Otay.

In December 1823 he was diarist with Brevet Captain José Romero when they were sent to find a route from Sonora (Mexico) to Alta California; on their expedition they first recorded the existence of Agua Caliente (hot water) at Palm Springs, California.

Sources

Further reading
 California Pioneer Register and Index, 1542—1848
 "The Estudillo Family", The Journal of San Diego History 15:1 (1969) by Sister Catherine McShane
 "Rancho Guajome", The Journal of San Diego History 41:4 (1995) by Iris H. W. Engstrand and Mary F. Ward
 José Romero papers. Archival material. Abstract: "Report, 16 January 1824, to Antonio Narbona from Palm Springs, on his activities in Alta California, and on the expedition undertaken with José María Estudillo to locate a trail to the Colorado River, and on the conditions that forced them to return to the Cahuilla Indian ranchería." University of California Library, Berkeley.

External links
 "José Maria Estudillo", from Smythe's History of San Diego (1907), p. 169

Californios
Land owners from California
People from San Diego
1830 deaths
Spanish emigrants to Mexico
People of Alta California
People of Mexican California
Year of birth missing